Arabibarbus arabicus is a species of ray-finned fish in the genus Arabibarbus which is found in wadis in the south western Arabian Peninsula.

References

Arabibarbus
Fish described in 1941